William I Raymond (1068–1095) was the count of Cerdanya and Berga from the year of his birth till that of his death, giving up Berga a year earlier to his son William-Jordan.

He was the son of Raymond I of Cerdanya, who died a short while after his birth. He married Sancha, daughter of Ramon Berenguer I, Count of Barcelona, while they were both very young. William became the tutor of his nephew, the future Ramon Berenguer III. He took an interest in repopulating parts of his domain and promulgated the charter to the people of Villafranca.

In 1094, he granted Berga to his sons and the elder, William, inherited Cerdanya when he died the next year.

Issue
 William II Jordan, Count of Cerdanya.
 Bernard, Count of Cerdanya.

External links
Image of a miniature, from the Liber feudorum Ceritaniae, depicting a convention between Folch, Bishop of Urgell, and William, concerning the castle of Cardona, of which Folch was lord. See also the whole page.

|-

|-

1068 births

1095 deaths
11th-century Catalan people